Feige is a surname. Notable people with the surname include:

 Claude Feige (born 1958), French curler
 David Feige, American lawyer, legal commentator and author
 Eric Feige (born 1961), American politician
 Gerhard Feige (born 1951), bishop of the Roman Catholic Diocese of Magdeburg, Germany
 Hans Feige (1880–1953), German General der Infantrie in the Wehrmacht during World War II
 Jasmin Feige (1959–1988), West German long and high jumper
 Kevin Feige (born 1973), American film producer
 Uriel Feige, Israeli computer scientist

See also
 Chang Fei, Taiwanese singer and television personality (nicknamed Fei Ge)

Jewish surnames